Yongding is a district under the jurisdiction of Longyan prefecture-level city in the southwest of Fujian Province, People's Republic of China. As of 2015, Yongding has a permanent population of about 361,000, of which more than 99% are Hakka, the rest being She people. In December 2014, the Fujian government signed legislation converting Yongding from a county to a district.

Yongding is the hometown of many overseas Chinese immigrants that came to south-east Asia and Burma during the British Raj.

History
Yongding County was established in the 14th year of Chenghua (AD 1478) in the Ming dynasty. It was originally part of Shanghang County. The governor of Fujian province proposed to separate this south-eastern part of the Shanghang County to form a new county and name it Yongding, literally meaning peaceful forever, after suppressing a riot in that particular region.

On December 13, 2014, the Fujian government passed a law converting Yongding from a county to a district. The law came into effect on February 9, 2015.

Geography
Located in the southwest of Fujian province, Yongding District is situated on the Fujian-Guangdong border. Yongding District is bordered by Nanjing County in Zhangzhou to the east, Pinghe County in Zhangzhou to the southeast, Dabu County and Meixian District of Meizhou, Guangdong to the southwest, Shanghang County to the northwest, and Xinluo District to the northeast. Both Dabu and Shanghang are Hakka-speaking counties; Longyan Centre, Nanjing and Pinghe are predominantly Minnan-speaking.

Like other counties of Fujian province, Yongding is 80% hills and mountains, 10% water or rivers, and 10% fields. Two major rivers run through the district: Yongding River and Xiayang Creek. Both are tributaries of the Ting River (the name by which it is known in Fujian territory) or Han River (the name by which it is known in Guangdong province).

Climate 

Administrative divisions
Yongding District current administers 1 subdistrict, 14 towns, and 9 townships.

divided into twenty-four township-level divisions: one subdistrict, twelve towns and eleven townships.

Subdistrict 
Fengcheng Subdistrict is the district's sole subdistrict, and had a population of 48,048 as of 2015.

Towns 

The district is home to the following 14 towns:

Townships
The district is home to the following 9 townships:

Demographics 
As of 2015, Yongding District has a hukou population of 504,520, but has approximately just 361,000 permanent residents. 44.3% of the district's permanent residents live in urban areas.

The district's urban residents have a per capita disposable income of 29,952 renminbi (RMB) as of 2015, a 7.1% increase from 2014. In 2015, this figure stood at 14,136 RMB for the district's rural residents, a 9.8% increase from 2014.

The , a part of the Tingzhou dialect of Hakka Chinese, is spoken in the district.

Culture

Yongding District is famous for its tulou, large multi-family adobe buildings.  Out of the 10 tulous or tulous clusters inscribed on the World Heritage List (as Fujian Tulou), 5 are within Yongding District:
 Chuxi Tulou cluster, in Chuxi Village, 
 Chengqi Lou and adjacent buildings (the ), in Gaobei Village, Gaotou Township
 Hongkeng Tulou cluster including Zhencheng Lou, in Hongkeng Village, Hukeng
 Zhenfu Lou, near Xipian Village, Hukeng
Yanxiang Lou, in Xinnan Village, Hukeng

Economy

Yongding District recorded a gross domestic product of 19.12 billion renminbi (RMB) in 2015, an 8.2% increase from 2014.

Industry 
Yongding District has a sizable automotive industry, which achieved an output of 3.151 billion RMB in 2015, a 0.8% increase from 2014. Fujian Motors Group has sizable operations in the district, where it produces engines for its New Longma brand, and multi-purpose vehicles for its Keyton brand.

As a result of abundant precipitation and mountainous terrain, hydroelectric power is abundant. There are numerous hydro plants in the district, one notable one being the provincial Mianhuatan Hydroelectric Power Station. The plant has a water storage capacity of 2.035 billion cubic meters and is able to generate 1.52 billion kilowatt hours of electricity a year. The Mianhuatan hydrodam contributes greatly to the rapidly growing economy of Fujian and neighboring Guangdong province.

Agriculture 
In agriculture, rice is the main crop for the district. Most low-lying fields can yield two rice crops per year, while in high land fields, because of the earlier frost, only one harvest can be assured.

Persimmons, plums, and tea leaves are grown in the district. Cattle are raised in Yongding District, and various beef products are produced in the district.

Yongding is an important tobacco producer. The cultivation of tobacco started in Wan Li era of the Ming Dynasty. Yongding was honored as the "home of tobacco" in the early 20th century. Although its significance has declined in recent years, Yongding is still one of the most important tobacco producing areas in the region. Many top brand Chinese cigarettes contain Yongding leaf.

During the 2010s, the local government began partnering local farmers with Taobao, a large Chinese e-commerce website, to create a wider market for local agricultural goods. As of 2015, the district is home to 200 million RMB in e-commerce sales.

Mining 
Yongding is rich in mineral deposits, most notably coal. Most of the district's coal is shipped to Guangdong, where economic growth has created huge demand for energy. This in turn has created demand for heavy trucks. As a result, Yongding is one of the top districts for the number of trucks.

Tourism 
In 2015 alone, 5.252 million tourists visited Yongding District, generating 4.029 billion RMB in income. Common tourist destinations include the district's many tulou clusters, such as Chuxi Tulou cluster, and hot springs.

Transportation 

Notable people
There have been many famous overseas Chinese with their roots in Yongding. Aw Boon-Haw was one of the most famous overseas Chinese in the 1930s and 40s.

References

External links
 
 

County-level divisions of Fujian
Longyan